CoCo Therapeutics is a United Kingdom-based biotechnology company formed in 2013 jointly by King's College London, the Wellcome Trust and Advent Venture Partners.  The company will focus on development of therapeutics for Alzheimer's disease which target retinoic acid receptor alpha, specifically building on work originating in the Neuroscience Drug Discovery Unit of King's College, led by Jonathan Corcoran.  This work was funded through the Wellcome Trust's Seeding Drug Discovery Initiative.

References

Biotechnology companies established in 2013
Biotechnology companies of the United Kingdom
2013 establishments in the United Kingdom